Merritt is an unincorporated community in Scott County, Illinois, United States.

Demographics

References

Unincorporated communities in Scott County, Illinois
Unincorporated communities in Illinois